Cedar Crest may refer to:

 Cedar Crest, California (disambiguation)
 Cedar Crest, Massachusetts
 Cedar Crest, New Mexico
 Cedar Crest, Oklahoma
 Cedar Crest (Faunsdale, Alabama), plantation on the National Register of Historic Places
 Cedar Crest (Gladwyne, Pennsylvania), an estate
 Cedar Crest (mansion), Kansas Governor mansion

See also
 Cedar Crest Boulevard near Allentown, Pennsylvania
 Cedar Crest College near Allentown, Pennsylvania